Amityville is the westernmost station on the Babylon Branch of the Long Island Rail Road in Suffolk County. It is located on John Street in Amityville, New York, but the official description of its location is not as precise. The MTA describes the station as being located on John Street between Sunrise Highway (NY 27) and NY 27A west of NY 110. John Street is located between Sterling Place and West Oak Street (Old Sunrise Highway, NY 900D).

History
Amityville station is typical of the elevated Babylon Branch stations that were rebuilt during the mid-to-late 20th century. It was originally built in 1868 by the South Side Railroad of Long Island, then replaced by a brick station in 1889. From 1890 to 1919, it was a stop for the Huntington Railroad cross-island trolley line, which included a bridge over the tracks on the west side of the station. It was also the terminus of the Amityville Line for of the Babylon Railroad trolley line from 1910 to 1920. When the trolleys were abandoned the cross-island trolley bridge over the tracks became a pedestrian crossover. The station building was completely demolished in 1964 and on October 25, 1968, a temporary station building was opened with high-level side platforms to accommodate the new M1 cars and facilitate the construction of the new grade separated Babylon Branch. The new elevated structure was opened on August 7, 1973. The 1868 station remains standing as a private residence. Amityville is also the site of the first interlocking after the Central Branch splits from the Babylon Branch.

Platform and tracks
The station has one 10-car-long high-level island platform between the two tracks. Twelve-car trains will not open doors of the last two cars westbound or first two cars eastbound.

References

External links

Two Former Amityville Stations (Arrt's Arrchives)
Amityville Station History (TrainsAreFun.com)
 Burch Avenue entrance from Google Maps Street View
AMITYVILLE Interlocking (The LIRR Today)

Long Island Rail Road stations in Suffolk County, New York
Railway stations in the United States opened in 1868